Events from the year 1168 in Ireland.

Incumbents
High King: Ruaidrí Ua Conchobair

Events
Domnall Mór Ua Briain becomes King of Thomond following the murder of his brother Muirchertach.
St Mary's Cathedral, Limerick is founded on the site of a palace given by Domnall Mór Ua Briain.

Deaths
Ua Cerbaill, Bishop of Roscrea.
Amhlaeibh Mac Innaighneorach, Chief Harper of Ireland.

References